Dixie is a feminine given name, nickname or stage name, and surname. It may refer to:

People with the surname 
 Lady Florence Dixie (1855–1905), Scottish traveller, war correspondent, writer and feminist
 Mark Dixie, a chef convicted of a 2005 murder
 Wolstan Dixie (1524 or 1525–1594), English merchant and administrator, Lord Mayor of London in 1585
 Sir Wolstan Dixie of Appleby Magna (1576–1650), High Sheriff of Leicestershire, Member of Parliament and founder of the Dixie Grammar School, great-nephew of the above

People with the given name
 Dixie Browning (born 1930), American artist and romance novelist
 Dixie Bull, English sea captain and pirate
 Dixie Carter (1939–2010), American stage and television actress
 Dixie Carter (wrestling), American former promoter and businesswoman
 Dixie D'Amelio (born 2001), American social media personality and singer, also known by the stage name Dixie
 Dixie Dean William Ralph "Dixie" Dean (22 January 1907–1 March 1980) was an English footballer who played as a centre forward.
 Dixie Bibb Graves (1882–1965), wife of Alabama Governor Bibb Graves and first woman United States Senator from Alabama
 Dixie Haygood (1861–1915), American stage magician
 Dixie L. Leavitt (born 1929), American entrepreneur and politician
 Dixie Selden (1868–1935), American painter
 Dixie Tan (1935–2014), Singaporean cardiologist and politician
 Dixie Willis (born 1941), Australian former middle distance runner

People with the nickname or stage name 
 Dixie Brown, English boxer Anthony George Charles (1900–1957)
 Dixie Davis (1905–1969), American lawyer for gangster Dutch Schultz
 Dixie Davis (baseball) (1890–1944), American Major League Baseball pitcher
 Dixie Dean (1907–1980), English footballer
 Dixie Deans (born 1946), Scottish former footballer
 Dixie Deans (RAF airman) (1913–1989), British Second World War bomber pilot and prisoner of war camp leader
 Dixie Dunbar (1919–1991), American actress
 Dixie Dynamite (born 1959), ring name of American professional wrestler Scott Armstrong
 Dixie Evans (1926–2013),  American burlesque dancer and stripper
Dixie Garr (born 1956), African-American computer engineer
 Dixie Gilmer (1901–1954), American politician
 Dixie Howell (1912–1971), American football and baseball player and coach, member of the College Football Hall of Fame
 Dixie Howell (catcher) (1920–1990), American Major League Baseball catcher
 Dixie Howell (pitcher) (1920–1960), American Major League Baseball pitcher
 Dixie Lee (1911–1952), American actress, dancer, and singer born Wilma Wyatt, first wife of singer Bing Crosby
 Dixie Leverett (1894–1957), American Major League Baseball pitcher
 Dixie McNeil (born 1947), English former footballer and manager
 Dixie Walker (1910–1982), American Major League Baseball player
 Dixie Walker (pitcher) (1887–1965), American Major League Baseball pitcher, father of the above
 Richard L. Walker (1922–2003), American scholar, author, and ambassador to South Korea

Fictional
 Dixie, a character in the 1987 American buddy cop action movie Lethal Weapon
 Dixie Clemets, in the video games Rumble Roses and Rumble Roses XX
 Dixie Cooney, on the daytime television show All My Children
 the title character of Dixie Dugan, an American nationally syndicated comic strip from 1929 to 1966
 Dixie Flatline, in William Gibson's 1984 cyberpunk novel Neuromancer
 Dixie Kong, an animated game character from Nintendo's Donkey Kong series
 Dixie McCall, the senior nurse at Rampart General Hospital on the television show Emergency!, played by Julie London

See also 
 
 
 Dixi (disambiguation)
 Dixie (disambiguation)
 Dixy (disambiguation)
 Dixy, a surname

Feminine given names